Instituto Español Juan de la Cierva is a Spanish international secondary school in Tétouan, Morocco. Operated by the Spanish Ministry of Education, as per Decree 3533/70 of 3 December it is a vocational school.

References

External links
 Instituto Español Juan de la Cierva 

Spanish international schools in Morocco
Tétouan